Taguan may refer to:

 Flying squirrel (the animal)
 taguan a traditional game of hide-and-seek, as played in the Philippines
 Taguan Mountain, a mountain in Taiwan